Reginald Harrison FRCS (24 August 1837 – 28 February 1908) was a British surgeon, sometime vice-president and Member of the Council of the Royal College of Surgeons and Consulting Surgeon to St Peter's Hospital.

Life

Harrison was educated at Rossall School, Lancashire, and after a short period of probation at the Stafford general hospital, he entered St. Bartholomew's Hospital, London, qualifying in 1859. In 1866 he returned to Lancashire to take up an appointment as assistant physician to the Liverpool Royal Infirmary becoming full surgeon in 1874, later to specialise in diseases of the male genito-urinary system.

In 1889 he returned to London as surgeon to St. Peter's Hospital for Stone and Other Urinary Diseases. He was the author of Surgical Disorders of the Urinary Organs, which became a standard text-book, and The Use of the Ambulance in Civil Practice, having taken an active part in the introduction of the ambulance system in Liverpool, an interest he continued in London, remaining president of the Street Ambulance Association until death.

He was admitted M.R.C.S. England on 15 April 1869, and in the same year he obtained the licence of the society of apothecaries.

He ceased active professional work in April 1906, when he resigned his post at St. Peter's hospital.

He died on 28 April 1908, and was buried at Highgate Cemetery.

Family
He married in 1864 Jane, only daughter of James Baron of Liverpool, and left one son and two daughters.

Notes

References 

1837 births
1908 deaths
Burials at Highgate Cemetery
British surgeons
People educated at Rossall School